Bethlehem Moravian College (formerly Bethlehem Teacher Training College) is a college located in Malvern, Jamaica.  The college grants the bachelor's degree in primary and secondary education, business studies, and hospitality and tourism management.  The College was founded in 1861 by the Jamaica Province of the Moravian Church.

References

Colleges in Jamaica
1861 establishments in North America
Educational institutions established in 1861
Moravian Church in Jamaica
1861 establishments in the British Empire